Aref Gholami { (born 19 April 1997) is an Iranian footballer who played as a center back for Esteghlal in the Persian Gulf Pro League.

Club career 
He made his first Persian Gulf Pro League debut on 1 December 2016 against Gostaresh Foolad.

International career 
On the 4th of October 2020, Dragan Skočić called him up for iran international football team ( Team Melli ) for friendlies against Uzbekistan and Mali. He made his debut for iran on 24 March 2022 against Korea Republic.

Personal life 
His older brother Ali Gholami is also a footballer.

Club career statistics 

Last Update:9 June 2018

Honours 

Esteghlal

 Persian Gulf Pro League: 2021–22
 Hazfi Cup runner-up: 2019–20, 2020–21
 Iranian Super Cup: 2022

References

External links 
 

Iranian footballers
Association football defenders
Sepahan S.C. footballers
Zob Ahan Esfahan F.C. players
Foolad FC players
Esteghlal F.C. players
1997 births
Living people
People from Gorgan